The 1951 Boston University Terriers football team was an American football team that represented Boston University as an independent during the 1951 college football season. In its fifth season under head coach Aldo Donelli, the team compiled a 6–4 record and outscored their opponents by a total of 299 to 157. Although they finished with four losses (including their final game of the season against an average 5–4 Syracuse team), defeated only one  opponent that was ranked at the time of the game (No. 16 Pacific (CA), which finished 6–5 and unranked), and defeated no opponents that finished with a winning percentage above .600 other than 7–3 William & Mary, the Terriers still managed to secure a spot on the final AP Poll, just shy of the top 15. This was largely due to two first place votes that were granted to the team, becoming only the second team to receive first place votes in the final poll with a winning percentage of .600 or worse, the first being 5–4–1 Holy Cross in 1942. The 1951 Boston team is considered by James Vautravers, a college football historian who analyzes past AP polls, to be the worst AP rated team of all time.

Schedule

References

Boston University
Boston University Terriers football seasons
Boston University Terriers football